The Hungarian Women's Volleyball League is a Hungarian women's volleyball competition organized by the Hungarian Volleyball Federation (Magyar Röplabda Szövetség, MRS), it was created in 1947.

History 
The Hungarian Women's Volleyball League also called Extraliga is Hungary topflight league in Women's Volleyball and the first edition was played in 1946/47 and was continually Exist since, Only the 1955/56 season wasn't Disputed, Among the most Dominated clubs there is the Nim-Se Budapest who won a total of 11 titles record followed by Újpesti TE 10 titles and most recently Vasas Sport Club with 6 the first two spot teams are qualified to represent Hungary in the European clubs competitions.

List of Champions

References

External links
Hungarian Volleyball Federation 
  Hungarian Extraliga. women.volleybox.net  

Hungary
Sports leagues established in 1947
1947 establishments in Hungary
Volleyball in Hungary 
Hungarian League